XHRQ-FM is a radio station on 97.1 FM in San Juan del Río, Querétaro. The station is owned by Respuesta Radiofónica and carries a grupera format known as La Z.

History
XHRQ began with a concession awarded to Audio Panorama, S.A., in 1988; Audio Panorama had sought the station since the mid-1970s, at which time it was proposed that XHRQ broadcast on 105.1. It was originally owned by Radiorama.

References

Radio stations in Querétaro